Yohan Goonasekera (born 8 November 1957), is a former Sri Lankan cricketer who played in two Test matches and three One Day Internationals in 1983. He is an old boy of Nalanda College Colombo.

External links
 

1957 births
Living people
Sri Lanka Test cricketers
Sri Lanka One Day International cricketers
Sri Lankan cricketers
Alumni of Nalanda College, Colombo